Luo Linquan (born April 1956) is the current Consul General of the People's Republic of China in San Francisco USA.  He entered this position in December 2014. Previously, Luo served as the People's Republic of China Ambassador to Ireland from 2011 to 2013 and People's Republic of China Ambassador to Greece from 2007 to 2011. Prior to his two ambassadorships, he worked in the Protocol Department of the Ministry of Foreign Affairs of the People's Republic of China, at the Ministry's Hong Kong office, and in China's Consulate-General in New York City. Luo is married with one son.

References

Living people
1956 births
Ambassadors of China to Greece
Ambassadors of China to Ireland
Grand Commanders of the Order of the Phoenix (Greece)
Diplomats of the People's Republic of China